The 1982–83 season of the European Cup Winners' Cup was won by Scottish club Aberdeen in an extra-time victory against Real Madrid. Alex Ferguson's young side defeated the Spanish giants after a notable victory over Bayern Munich in the quarter-final. Having conquered the domestic game in Scotland, by defeating the European Cup holders Hamburger SV to win the 1983 European Super Cup, Aberdeen went on to become the only Scottish team to win two European trophies, a record which still stands today. 
It was the second and last time the title went to Scotland, following Rangers' victory in 1972.

Preliminary round

|}

First leg

Second leg

First round

|}

First leg

Second leg

Second round

|}

First leg

Second leg

Quarter-finals

|}

First leg

Second leg

Semi-finals

|}

First leg

Second leg

Final

Top scorers

See also
1982–83 European Cup
1982–83 UEFA Cup

External links
 1982-83 competition at UEFA website
 Cup Winners' Cup results at Rec.Sport.Soccer Statistics Foundation
 Cup Winners Cup Seasons 1982-83–results, protocols
 website Football Archive 1982–83 Cup Winners Cup

3
UEFA Cup Winners' Cup seasons